Schetrompf is a surname. Notable people with the surname include:

Doris Schetrompf, later Rose Lee Maphis, American country singer
Stanley Schetrompf, architect of Hagerstown Speedway, Maryland, United States